Louis R. Bruce (1877–1968) was an American Major League Baseball outfielder. He played for the Philadelphia Athletics during the  season.

The son of a Mohawk chief from the St. Regis Mohawk Reservation in upstate New York, he attended Central High School in Philadelphia, where he excelled as a student while playing baseball. Discovered by Ed Barrow, he played for the minor league Toronto Maple Leafs from 1900 to 1903, where he was a two-way player, pitching and playing the outfield and finding success in both roles. He also attended the University of Pennsylvania Dental School during those days, and after retiring as a player, earned a degree in theology from Syracuse University.

He was one of the first Native Americans to reach the major leagues, following Chief Sockalexis, Bill Phyle, his teammate Chief Bender and Ed Pinnance.

He was a practicing minister for many years and a promoter of education and citizenship for Native Americans. His son, Louis R. Bruce, was a politician who served as Commissioner of Indian Affairs.

References

External links
Biography from the Society for American Baseball Research
Penn University Biography

1877 births
1968 deaths
American Mohawk people
Baseball players from New York (state)
Central High School (Philadelphia) alumni
Columbus Senators players
Indianapolis Indians players
Major League Baseball outfielders
Native American baseball players
People from Franklin County, New York
Philadelphia Athletics players
Syracuse University alumni
Toronto Canucks players
Toronto Maple Leafs (International League) players
Toronto Royals players
University of Pennsylvania School of Dental Medicine alumni
American expatriate baseball players in Canada
American Methodist clergy
Native American suffragists